Enough is Enough (DJB) is a right-wing populist political party in Serbia.

It was established on 27 January 2014 around the former minister of economy Saša Radulović and his associates from the ministry. Initially, the party had strong liberal, reformist, and progressive views, and in the 2016 parliamentary election they entered the parliament with 16 seats in total. Between early 2017 and 2018, its pro-European and liberal factions split off due to the internal conflict in the party. Since then, the party has shifted to the far-right and it began advocating souverainist and eurosceptic policies alongside numerous right-wing populist stances such as opposition to immigration. Its leader, Saša Radulović also promoted misinformation and several conspiracy theories during the COVID-19 pandemic.

History 
It was founded on 27 January 2014 as Association "It's Enough – Restart", and since then it was commonly known as Enough is Enough (abbr. DJB). In 2014 Serbian parliamentary election, held less than two months after establishment, the organization won 2.09% of votes. In yet another early 2016 Serbian parliamentary election, DJB won 6.02% (227,626 votes), thus gaining 16 seats in the National Assembly.

The It's Enough–Restart group in the National Assembly lost three of its members in February 2017, when Aleksandra Čabraja, Jovan Jovanović, and Sonja Pavlović left to start an organization called the Civic Platform. After long delay in deciding whether to take part in the 2017 Serbian presidential election, DJB eventually appointed Saša Radulović as candidate for the election. He came in seventh place with 51,651 votes (1.41%).

On 15 March 2018, Ljupka Mihajlovska resigned from the DJB assembly group to sit as an independent. The following day, Miloš Bošković resigned from DJB and also resigned from the assembly, returning his mandate to the association.

In 2018, DJB main board expelled assembly members Nenad Božić, Vladimir Đurić, and Aleksandar Stevanović from membership in the association on 29 March 2018.  Tatjana Macura also resigned from the association on 12 April 2018, following a brief, abortive bid for its presidency. Macura subsequently started a new association called the Free MPs parliamentary group, joined by Božić, Đurić, Mihajlovska, and Stevanović. In addition, Bošković's replacement Nada Kostić ultimately chose not to sit with DJB. In the aftermath of these changes, DJB had seven deputies in the assembly.

Only several months later, Dušan Pavlović left the DJB. This led to another wave of leaving. Another five deputies leave the DJB parliamentary club. By the mid-November 2018, DJB was reduced to only two deputies in the Assembly (Radulović and Stamenković) and no parliamentary club.

In the 2018 Belgrade election, a combined DJB–Dveri list failed to pass the electoral threshold. Saša Radulović subsequently stepped down as president of the party on 6 March 2018, along with all deputy presidents. On 21 April 2018 Branislav Mihajlović, head of the DJB in Bor, was elected party president. On 8 November 2018 Branislav Mihajlović was dismissed and replaced by deputy party president Branka Stamenković as a temporary leader. DJB joined other opposition parties in National Assembly sessions boycott.

On 14 December 2018, group of former DJB MPs formed centrist Party of Modern Serbia.

On 19 October 2019, Saša Radulović was re-elected as party leader, while Branka Stamenković was elected deputy president. On 7 March 2020. DJB declared 2020 Serbian parliamentary election boycott together with Alliance for Serbia coalition and Social Democratic Party. They eventually decided to participate in the elections, but failed to pass the 3% threshold (earned 2.32%), thus becoming non-parliamentary organization.

DJB took part on the 2022 parliamentary elections in coalition with Milan Stamatović (mayor of the Čajetina municipality and the leader of Healthy Serbia movement), and doctor Jovana Stojković, known for her anti-vaccine attitudes. They ran under the name Sovereignists, but again failed to clear the 3 per cent threshold. After the April elections, DJB became inactive until February 2023, when it was announced that it would become politically active again.

Ideology 
It was historically a centrist party, and it supported liberalism, neoliberalism, and progressivism. It was also focused on populist, anti-establishment and anti-corruption rhetoric, and it advocated reformism. Since 2018, it has been described as a right-wing populist, and conservative party, and it opposes immigration. It is positioned on the right-wing and far-right on the political spectrum, and it is also supportive of souverainism and euroscepticism.

Presidents of Dosta je bilo (2014–present)

Electoral performance

Parliamentary elections

Presidential elections

Provincial elections

See also 
 :Category:Enough is Enough (party) politicians
 List of political parties in Serbia

References

External links 
Official website

2014 establishments in Serbia
Liberal parties in Serbia
Political parties established in 2014
Progressivism
Social liberal parties
Conservative parties in Serbia
National conservative parties
Eurosceptic parties in Serbia
Right-wing parties in Europe
Right-wing populism in Serbia
Anti-immigration politics in Europe
Populist parties
Far-right politics in Serbia